The Bernstein–Kushnirenko theorem (or Bernstein–Khovanskii–Kushnirenko (BKK) theorem ), proven by David Bernstein and  in 1975, is a theorem in algebra. A more precise statement is as follows:

Statement
That is:

where for each  we have used the shorthand notation  to denote the monomial 

 

where each  is a generic element in the (finite dimensional vector space) 

The Bernstein–Kushnirenko theorem states that the number of solutions  of such a system is equal to

where  denotes the Minkowski mixed volume and for each  is the convex hull of the finite set of points . Clearly,  is a convex lattice polytope; it can be interpreted as the Newton polytope of a generic element of the subspace .

Trivia
Kushnirenko's name is also spelt Kouchnirenko. David Bernstein is a brother of Joseph Bernstein. Askold Khovanskii has found about 15 different proofs of this theorem.

References 

Theorems in algebra
Theorems in geometry